Collège des Frères de Jaffa is a French international school on Yefet Street #23 in Jaffa, a district of Tel Aviv. A part of the La Sallian educational institutions, it opened in 1882. Originally it was in the Mutasarrifate of Jerusalem, Ottoman Empire, before being in the British Mandate of Palestine; currently it is in Israel.

Hosting one of six French international high school programs in Israel, it serves levels maternelle (preschool) through terminale (final year of high school), with quatrième through terminale under the AEFE.

Notable alumni
Élie Barnavi, historian and diplomat
Scandar Copti, filmmaker 
Ghassan Kanafani, writer
Ayman Sikseck, author and literary critic

See also
 Education in the Ottoman Empire
 List of schools in the Ottoman Empire

References

External links
 Collège des Frères de Jaffa
 

Jaffa
High schools in Israel
French international schools in Israel
1882 establishments in the Ottoman Empire
Educational institutions established in 1882
European-Israeli culture in Tel Aviv
Schools in Tel Aviv
Lasallian schools